Khaz is an Armenian neume, one of a set of special signs (plural: khaz or khazes) constituting the traditional system of musical notation that has been used to transcribe religious Armenian music since the 8th century.

References

Musical notation
Armenian music